is a district of Higashi-ku, Fukuoka, in Fukuoka Prefecture, Japan. It is divided into six chōme, numbered 1 to 6, with a total population of 8,813 and 5,341 households (as of 31 August 2011). The postal code for addresses in Maidashi is 812–0054. The "Maidashi" school district includes parts of the Higashi Hama district.

Geography
It is located to the west of Hakozaki Shrine.

Etymology
 means horse and  means offer in Japanese. It is said that the name of Maidashi derives from a historical event at which the town people provided horses for participants at a festival in Hakozaki-gu. The name has been used since the end of Heian Period.

History

In the Kamakura Period, when the Mongols attempted to invade Japan, Hakata suffered a surprise attack, which led the Kamakura bakuhu, Japan's feudal government, to create a bulwark against the Mongolian invaders.

At the end of the Sengoku period, after Kyūshū Campaign, Toyotomi Hideyoshi settled by the sea shore, and ordered Sen no rikyu to hold a tea party. The pine tree where Rikyu boiled kettle for the tea ceremony still exists in the Kyushu University Medical campus. During the Edo period, there were many domestic expenditures which made  and roofing panel and Sanpo, ritual article, to be ordered out by Hakozaki-gu.

In 1903,  was established. 
In 1911, the Kyushu Imperial University medical school was established.

Education and child care

In addition, there are top level institutes of Japan such as Kyushu University Medical Institute of Bioregulation, Kyushu University Research Center for Prevention of Infections Diseases, and Kyushu University Research Center for Genetic Information.

In Maidashi the number of children has been increasing since 1990.

City
There is a shopping mall called , which attracts many people from surrounding areas during holidays. There is an international school in Maidashi.

Garden city

There are many gardens, such as Azuma Koen, Maidashi ryokuchi, Kyushu University campus, etc. The maidachi area is famous for being a garden city. Fukuoka city has a high number of parks for Japan, especially the Midashi area with low population density and educational facility and research establishment cover a much larger area. 
Maidashi ryokuchi is not only a park but also a historic site which gives the citizens opportunities to learn the modern history of Hukuoka since the Meiji era.

Parks:
Maidashi ryokuchi
Hakozaki-gu hana teien

Waterfront

Formally the coast line retreated at the point of the Kyushu University Maidashi campus today, where there was a place of scenic beauty with white sands and pine groves called . Nowadays as a fabulous view of the sea is to be a key selling point, some high-rise condominiums, targeted for high-income class, have been constructed.

Medical and welfare facilities

In the Maidashi area there are twelve medical organizations, and per capita number of doctors, nurses, and beds is well above the national average.

Transportation

Rail
Maidashi-Kyūdai-byōin-mae Station (Fukuoka City Subway Hakozaki Line)

Road
Japan National Route 3

References

External links

Geography of Fukuoka